Dynatocephala is a genus of moths belonging to the family Tortricidae.

Species
Dynatocephala altivola Razowski, 2009
Dynatocephala omophaea (Meyrick, 1926)

See also
List of Tortricidae genera

References

 , 1983, Zool. Verh. Leiden 204: 112.
 , 2005, World Catalogue of Insects 5
 , 2009, Tortricidae from Vietnam in the collection of the Berlin Museum.5. Archipini and Sparganothini (Lepidoptera: Tortricidae), Shilap revista de Lepidopterologia 37 (145): 41–60.

External links
tortricidae.com

Archipini
Tortricidae genera